Mary Simpson may refer to:

People
 Mary Simpson (priest) (1925–2011), one of the first women to be ordained an Episcopal priest (1977)
 Mary Simpson (Northern Ireland politician), unionist politician in Northern Ireland in the 1970s and 1980s
 Mary Simpson (violinist), violinist known for performing in Yanni's orchestra
 Mary Elizabeth Simpson (1865–1948), New Zealand religious teacher, healer and writer
 Mary Ellen Simpson, musician in The Ace of Cups
 Mary Kell Simpson (1903–1970), South Australian physiotherapist later known as Dorothy Kell Finnis
 Mary Simpson (house servant)
 Mary Jean Simpson, American scholar and public servant
 Mollie Evans (1922-2016), British antique dealer, born Mary Simpson

Characters
Mary Simpson, fictional character in the 1632 book series
Mary Simpson, fictional character on the TV series The Andy Griffith Show
Mary Simpson, fictional character in the film Two Mafiamen in the Far West